Ghatothkachudu is a 1995 Telugu-language fantasy comedy film co-written and directed by S. V. Krishna Reddy. The film is produced by K. Atchi Reddy under the Manisha Films banner. It stars Satyanarayana, Ali, Roja while Nagarjuna, Dr. Rajasekhar in a cameo appearance with music composed by S. V. Krishna Reddy. The film was recorded as a super hit at the box office. This movie also included the character Thota Ramudu from Yamaleela in which Tanikella Bharani who acted the role in the original movie, reprised his role.

Plot
The film deals with mythological character Ghatotkacha. The prologue of the film shows that Ghatotkacha (Kaikala Sathyanarayana) is mortally wounded in the Kurukshetra War and falls. He is helped by a little tribal girl when he asks for water. He promises her that he will repay this whenever she needs it.

Hundreds of years later the same little girl is born as Chitti. Her parents Koteswara Rao (Sarath Babu) and Sudha (Sudha) are rich NRIs. She is the only heir of all the riches. Two of his family members Chalapathi Rao (Chalapathi Rao) and Shivaji Raja (Sivaji Raja) have a crooked plan to kill all of them and get the assets. Basanna (Rallapalli) is a servant in their house who is dumb. He saves the girl in several attempts made by the duo. Knowing that they cannot successfully execute their plan with the servant in the house, they throw him away from the house according to a plan. Sensing the danger to the life of their kid, they want to sell off all their properties and go to a foreign country again. The duo tries to kill the entire family by planting a bomb in their car. The girl escapes from the accident, but her parents are killed. The goons try to kill her also, but Kaka saves her by sacrificing his own life. Later she is rescued by Basanna's son Ranga (Ali).

Ranga takes her and runs for his life. At last, they enter a forest and when the assassins are about to kill her, she calls for help. Ghatotkacha remembers his promise and rescues her.

Later, A robot named Subbarao saves Roja (Roja), when a criminal (AVS) who says the words, ‘Rangu Paddudi, tries to murder her.’ He falls in love with Roja. Then, he visits Ghatotkacha, Chitti, and Roja.

Later, Thota Ramudu (Tanikella Bharani), Rangu Paduddi, Chalapathi Rao and Sivaji Raja try to kill Chitti. They succeed before Ghatotkacha comes after smashing the 10000 Watt Powered Subbarao. He asks Lord Anjaneya to return Chitti's life. In avail, Ghatotkacha becomes a supergiant and reverses time, by holding onto Earth.

He appears at the correct time before Chitti has an accident and he scares the gang away. He uses his power to change the robot, Subbarao should kill Chalapathi Rao, Wizard (Kota Srinivasa Rao), Rangupadidi, and the Scientist (Tinnu Anand) who created him.

Subbarao kills Chalapathi by a laser beam redirection. Ghatotkacha removed Wizard's body and played Tennis with his head and Subbarao destroyed it. He tossed Rangupadidi and he melted and he exploded Scientist and his lab.

Thota Ramudu was forced to stay on Scrap Collector's (Brahmanandam) TV for betraying Ghatotkacha.

Sivaji Raja and Wizard's Henchmen are beaten in an accident. In which a ball controlled by a watch, is changed to 100-500 balls instead.

After Subbarao completes his new job. Ghatotkacha took his 10000-watt power and reduced it to 220 watts.

Cast

Soundtrack

References

1995 films
Films directed by S. V. Krishna Reddy
Films scored by S. V. Krishna Reddy
1990s Telugu-language films
1995 comedy films